Aathi Parasakthi is a 1971 Indian Tamil-language Hindu mythological film directed by K. S. Gopalakrishnan and produced by Chitra Productions. It stars Gemini Ganesan and Jayalalithaa. The film was dubbed in Hindi as Jai Jagat Janani (1976).

Plot 
The film tells the tales of the primordial goddess Sakthi in anthological format. The tales include:

 Abhirami Bhattar being rescued by Sakthi from his predicament by using her earring as a full moon on a new moon day. He goes on to narrate the rest of the tales to the Serafoji king.
 Mariamman first taking away the vision of Petersbury when he mocks and goes on to violate the rules of temple only to give it back to him when he repents thereby turning him to a devotee. She also rescues him in the form of a little girl when his house is about to demolished in a natural calamity.
 Mariamman giving her darshan to a devout fisherman who, following the advice of a great ascetic, goes on to attempt to kill himself if he doesn't get to see her in person. The ascetic himself though fails to follow his advice of wanting to see her as one is desperate for oxygen and fails to see her. 
 A new asura on the block dominates and takes over not only devas and rishis but also trimurtis. They all worship together and get Parasakthi to appear and save them.
 Trimurtis fight with their wife forcing them to leave their spouses. They lose their power, weaken which is taken advantage of by an evil asura. They beg for Parasakthi's forgiveness, who in the form of spouses, were the source of their power. She takes the form of a dancer who makes the asuras kill each other, which was their boon as in they cannot be killed by anyone else, and rescues the universe. 
 Parasakthi, through her son Muruga, gives the power of speech to an mute child turning him to a great poet to fulfil the desire of a desolate king who repents that there is no epoch defining poet in his kingdom which he sees as a personal failure.

Cast 
Gemini Ganesan as Shiva
Jayalalithaa as Adi Parashakti, Sati, Parvati, Meenakshi
Padmini as Village lady who gives eyesight to Petersbury and later shows him divine vision as Kamakshi, Visalakshi, Meenakshi, Mariamman and Sakthi
R. Muthuraman
S. V. Ranga Rao as Daksha
Vanisri as Mohini
M. N. Nambiar
Rajasree as Lakshmi
Venniradai Nirmala
Shylashri
Sridevi as Kartikeya
S. Varalakshmi as Adi Parashakti, Mariamman, Durga
 V. Gopalakrishnan
 Major Sundarrajan as the foreigner
 Suruli Rajan as the fisherman
 S. V. Subbaiah as Abirami Pattar
 S. V. Sahasranamam
A. Karunanidhi
 O. A. K. Thevar
E. R. Sahadevan

Soundtrack 
The music was composed by K. V. Mahadevan. The song "Naan Aatchi" is set in Anandabhairavi raga.

Release 
The film was successful at the box office and made more than other films that were released at the same time namely Babu, Neerum Neruppum, and Veettukku Oru Pillai.

References

External links 

1970 films
1970s Tamil-language films
1971 films
Films about Hinduism
Films about reincarnation
Films about royalty
Films about shapeshifting
Films directed by K. S. Gopalakrishnan
Films scored by K. V. Mahadevan
Films with screenplays by K. S. Gopalakrishnan
Hindu devotional films
Hindu mythological films
Indian dance films
Indian epic films
Indian musical films
Religious epic films